Hrenova is a settlement in the Municipality of Vojnik in eastern Slovenia. The area is part of the traditional region of Styria. It is now included with the rest of the municipality in the Savinja Statistical Region.

Archaeological evidence from the Big Peak site near the village has shown Iron Age and Late Antiquity settlement layers.

References

External links
Hrenova at Geopedia

Populated places in the Municipality of Vojnik